{{DISPLAYTITLE:H4 polytope}}

In 4-dimensional geometry, there are 15 uniform polytopes with H4 symmetry. Two of these, the 120-cell and 600-cell, are regular.

Visualizations 
Each can be visualized as symmetric orthographic projections in Coxeter planes of the H4 Coxeter group, and other subgroups.

The 3D picture are drawn as Schlegel diagram projections, centered on the cell at pos. 3, with a consistent orientation, and the 5 cells at position 0 are shown solid.

Coordinates 
The coordinates of uniform polytopes from the H4 family are complicated.  The regular ones can be expressed in terms of the golden ratio φ = (1 + )/2 and σ = (3 + 1)/2. Coxeter expressed them as 5-dimensional coordinates.<ref>Coxeter, Regular and Semi-Regular Polytopes II, Four-dimensional polytopes', p.296-298</ref>

 References
 J.H. Conway and M.J.T. Guy: Four-Dimensional Archimedean Polytopes, Proceedings of the Colloquium on Convexity at Copenhagen, page 38 und 39, 1965 
 John H. Conway, Heidi Burgiel, Chaim Goodman-Strauss, The Symmetries of Things 2008,  (Chapter 26)
 H.S.M. Coxeter:
 H.S.M. Coxeter, Regular Polytopes, 3rd Edition, Dover New York, 1973
 Kaleidoscopes: Selected Writings of H.S.M. Coxeter, edited by F. Arthur Sherk, Peter McMullen, Anthony C. Thompson, Asia Ivic Weiss, Wiley-Interscience Publication, 1995,  Wiley::Kaleidoscopes: Selected Writings of H.S.M. Coxeter
 (Paper 22) H.S.M. Coxeter, Regular and Semi Regular Polytopes I, [Math. Zeit. 46 (1940) 380-407, MR 2,10]
 (Paper 23) H.S.M. Coxeter, Regular and Semi-Regular Polytopes II, [Math. Zeit. 188 (1985) 559-591]
 (Paper 24) H.S.M. Coxeter, Regular and Semi-Regular Polytopes III, [Math. Zeit. 200 (1988) 3-45]
 N.W. Johnson: The Theory of Uniform Polytopes and Honeycombs'', Ph.D. Dissertation, University of Toronto, 1966

Notes

External links
 
 Uniform, convex polytopes in four dimensions:, Marco Möller  
 

 H4 uniform polytopes with coordinates: {5,3,3}, {3,3,5}, r{5,3,3},r{3,3,5}, t{3,3,5}, t{5,3,3}, rr{3,3,5}, rr{5,3,3}, tr{3,3,5}, tr{5,3,3}, 2t{5,3,3}, t03{5,3,3}, t013{3,3,5}, t013{5,3,3}, t0123{5,3,3}, grand antiprism

4-polytopes